The Magadi Soda Company manufactures soda ash at the Kenyan town of Magadi, which is in southwestern Kenya. It is the largest manufacturer of soda ash in Africa. The company was founded in 1911 and mines trona from Lake Magadi, in the Rift Valley. Lake Magadi has one of the purest surface deposits of trona. The trona is converted by Magadi to soda ash, at a facility near the mining operations, and the soda ash is transported by rail to Mombasa for onward shipping.

Magadi is a subsidiary of Brunner Mond, Imperial Chemical Industries, and of Tata Chemicals, and is headquartered in Magadi, Kenya.

Transport 
The company operates a railway branchline linking with the main Kenyan Railway System.

See also 

 Titus Naikuni
 Tata Chemicals
 Tata Group

References

External links 
 Magadi Soda Company Official Website

Mining companies of Kenya
Chemical companies of Kenya
Kajiado County
1911 establishments in Kenya
Tata Chemicals